Arrhythmica is a genus of moths in the subfamily Arctiinae. It is monotypic, with the single species, Arrhythmica semifusca, found in Australia. Both the genus and species were first described by Turner in 1940.

References

Lithosiini
Monotypic moth genera
Moths of Australia
Taxa described in 1940